Fenelon Dobyns Hewitt was a Democratic member of the Mississippi House of Representatives, representing Pike County, from 1916 to 1920 and from 1944 to 1948.

Biography 
Fenelon Dobyns Hewitt was born on February 26, 1883, near Smithdale, in Amite County, Mississippi. He attended the Mars Hill Public School in Amite County. He attended Millsaps College, graduating with honors in 1905. He graduated from the University of Mississippi with a L. L. B. in 1907. He began practicing law in the same year in McComb, Mississippi. He was a Judge of the Police Court there from 1909 to 1913. After being elected in November 1915, he represented Pike County as a Democrat in the Mississippi House of Representatives from 1916 to 1920. Later, he served another term in the same position from 1944 to 1948.

References 

1883 births
Year of death missing
People from McComb, Mississippi
Democratic Party members of the Mississippi House of Representatives
Mississippi lawyers